T. J. Fast (born September 2, 1987) is a Canadian former professional ice hockey defenceman who last played with Heilbronner Falken of the German DEL2.

Playing career
Fast began his junior career in the Alberta Junior Hockey League (AJHL) for two seasons playing for the Calgary Royals and Camrose Kodiaks. After his second AJHL season in 2004–05, he was drafted in the 2005 NHL Entry Draft by the Los Angeles Kings as the 60th overall pick in the second round. He subsequently joined the college hockey ranks with the University of Denver. However, after one-and-a-half seasons with Denver, he moved to major junior to play for the Tri-City Americans of the Western Hockey League (WHL). In 2007–08, Fast recorded a 17-goal, 54-point season to earn WHL West First Team All-Star honours.

Following his final junior season, he was traded by the Kings to the St. Louis Blues on June 4, 2008, in exchange for a fifth round draft pick in 2009.

On August 3, 2010, Fast was traded to the Florida Panthers in exchange for Graham Mink.

To start the 2011–12 season, Fast was signed by the Greenville Road Warriors. Before he made his debut with the Warriors he was loaned to the Connecticut Whale and appeared in one game. After he was returned to the Road Warriors he was immediately loaned again to the AHL with the Hamilton Bulldogs. On December 16, 2011, Fast was signed for the remainder of the season by the Bulldogs.

In the midway point of the following season, without ever debuting with Greenville, Fast's rights were traded by the Road Warriors to the Bakersfield Condors for Zach Cohen on January 9, 2013. Fast was eventually signed to a contract and appeared in 17 games for the Condors in the 2012-13 season.

On July 4, 2013, Fast signed as a free agent to his first European contract on a one-year deal with German club, ETC Crimmitschau of the DEL2.

Career statistics

Awards and honours

References

External links

1987 births
Living people
Alaska Aces (ECHL) players
Bakersfield Condors (1998–2015) players
Camrose Kodiaks players
Canadian ice hockey defencemen
Cincinnati Cyclones (ECHL) players
Connecticut Whale (AHL) players
Denver Pioneers men's ice hockey players
ETC Crimmitschau players
Hamilton Bulldogs (AHL) players
Heilbronner Falken players
Los Angeles Kings draft picks
Peoria Rivermen (AHL) players
Rochester Americans players
Ice hockey people from Calgary
Tri-City Americans players
Canadian expatriate ice hockey players in Germany